Blingel is a commune in the Pas-de-Calais department in the Hauts-de-France region in northern France.

Geography
A small village situated some 5 miles(8 km) northeast of Hesdin at the D94 and D107 crossroads.

Population

See also
Communes of the Pas-de-Calais department

References

Communes of Pas-de-Calais
Artois